Physical Therapy is a jazz fusion band from St. Louis, Missouri active in the 1990s. They produced two albums under the Sweatshop Records label, the first being the self-titled Physical Therapy (1992), and the second work being a theme album called Casino (1997).

The band used a variety of instruments and synthesizers and recorded digitally to maintain a high production standard. Priding the band on the use of real musicians, they boasted on their first album that no drum machines or music sequencers were used in its production. Later, on Casino, the band solicited guest help from a number of local musicians who contributed to over half the album. The second album did contain sparse sequencing. Both albums were recorded locally in St. Louis, with the first being produced at K Audio Inc., and the second at "The Chapel" studios. Terry Coleman, Brian White, Michael Fitzgerald and Ben Monroe produced each album, with Monroe doing engineering and sound mixing. Additionally, both albums contain writeups on the back of the CD tray that string together the track titles in a humorous paragraph related to the general theme of the album.

In 1993, 1998, and 2010, their work was featured on The Weather Channel as part of its Local on the 8's local forecast program. The band does not have a website, and other information about the band is difficult to come by; Physical Therapy is not listed at MusicBrainz, The band has two CDs and only one album is listed at Allmusic. The band members are currently still performing and recording as session players and solo performers worldwide.

Personnel

Terrance Coleman  - Bass, Keyboards, Acoustic Guitar
Michael Fitzgerald - Soprano, Alto, and Tenor saxophone, and Keyboards
Ben Monroe - Drums and Percussion
Brian White - Acoustic Guitar, Electric Guitar, and MIDI Guitars, and Keyboards
Kevin James - Keyboards and Vocals (Physical Therapy only)
Kent McVey - Keyboards (Casino only)
Mark Owens - Keyboards (Casino only)

Discography

Physical Therapy – 1992
Casino – 1997

References

American jazz ensembles from Missouri
Musical groups established in 1992
Musical groups disestablished in 1997
Jazz fusion ensembles
Smooth jazz ensembles